The 2022-2023 Le Mans Virtual Series was the second season of the Le Mans Virtual Series which is an Esports endurance series. The five-event season began at the Bahrain International Circuit on 17 September 2022 and finished at the Circuit de la Sarthe for the 24 Hours of Le Mans Virtual on 14–15 January 2023.

The series is open for Le Mans Prototype (LMP2) and Le Mans Grand Touring Endurance (LMGTE) classes.

Calendar

Entries 
The entry list is divided into two categories of vehicles: LMP2 and GTE.

LMP2

LMGTE 

 Notes

Results 
Bold indicates overall winner

  – The #8 R8G Esports LMP2, qualified by Marcell Csincsik put down the fastest lap of the day, however, they won’t be leading the virtual field to the green flag at Sebring. Due to a penalty stemming from an incident at Spa-Francorchamps in the previous month, the #23 Porsche Coanda will instead lead the field in the 500 Miles of Sebring. Per the broadcast, Article 17 of the Code of Conduct was breached and therefore all R8G Esports teams would have consequences. With that, all three of the R8G Esports cars in the field will be slapped with 10-place grid penalties for Saturday’s event, including the #8 and #18 LMP2s as well as the #888 Ferrari in the GTE category. Moving up from the second spot, Josh Rogers laid down the second fastest lap and will be starting from the pole instead with his #23 Porsche Coanda.

Teams' Championships 
Points are awarded according to the following structure:

LMP2

LMGTE

References

External links
 

Virtual
2022 in esports
2023 in esports